The discography of VNV Nation, an Irish electronic music project, consists of ten studio albums, two compilation album, three extended plays, and twelve singles.

Albums

Studio albums

Compilations

Live albums

Extended plays

Singles

Compilations
Cyber-Tec America – (CD) 1995, Track #1 "Serial Killer (Tormented Version) – Invisible
Elektrauma Vol. 2 – (CD) 1995, Track #12 "Requiem QCN (Martyr Version)" – Discordia
Maschinenwelt Compilation – (CD) 1995, Track #9 "After Shock" – 	Maschinenwelt Records
Taste This 4 – (2xCD) 1995, Disc #1, Track #5 "After Fire" – Discordia
Best of Electronic Music – (2xCD, Ltd. Edition) 1998, Disc #2, Track # 4 "Solitary" – TCM Musikproduktionsgesellschaft mbH
Deejay Tribe – (2xCD) 1998, Disc #1, Track #11 "Honour" – Credo
Moonraker Vol. IV – (2xCD) 1998, Disc #1, Track #1 "Honour (Memorial Mix)" – Sub Terranean
New Violent Breed – (CD) 1998, Track #3 "Solitary (Signals Edit)" – COP International
The Flatline Compilation – (2xCD) 1998, Disc #2, Track #13 "Procession" – Flatline Records
The Tyranny Off the Beat Vol. V – (2xCD) 1998, Disc #1, Track #2 "Solitary" – Off Beat
Virtual X-mas 98 – (CD Mini, Ltd. Edition, Promo) 1998, Track #2 "Solitary (Signals Edit)" – Energy Rekords
We Came to Dance – Indie Dancefloor Vol. 11 – (2xCD) 1998, Disc #1, Track #4 "Honour (Memorial Remix)" – Sub Terranean
Zillo Festival Sampler 1998 – (2xCD) 1998, Disc #1, Track #15 "Joy" – Zillo
ZilloScope: New Signs & Sounds 07-08/98 – (CD Sampler) 1998, Track #15 "Serial Killer (Version)" – Zillo
Best of Electronic Music Vol. 2 – (2xCD) 1999, Disc #1, Track #14 "Rubicon" – TCM Musikproduktionsgesellschaft mbH
Electro Club Attack – Shot Two – (2xCD) 1999, Disc #2, Track #3 "Solitary (Signals Edit)" – XXC, Zoomshot Media Entertainment
Electro Mania – (CD) 1999, Track #7 "Honour" – Zoth Ommog
Elegy – Numéro 3 – (CD) 1999, Track #4 "Rubicon" – Elegy
Extreme Clubhits III – (CD) 1999, Track #4 "Rubicon (Full Length)" – UpSolution Recordings
Sacrilege – A Tribute to Front 242 – (CD) 1999, Track #2 "Circling Overland" and Track #6 "DSM0" – Cleopatra
Septic – (CD, Ltd. Edition) 1999, Track #9 "Rubicon (Raw Version)" – Dependent Records
Sonic Seducer Cold Hands Seduction Vol. II – (CD Sampler) 1999, Track #4 "Rubicon (Empires-Version)" – Sonic Seducer
Wax Trax! & TVT Records Present: Master Mix – (CD Promo) 1999, Track #11 "Ascension" – Wax Trax!, TVT Records
Zillo Club Hits 4 – (CD) 1999, Track #4 "Joy" – Zillo
Zillo Mystic Sounds 8 – (CD) 1999, Track #14 "Afterfire (Exkl. Remix) – Zillo
Club Bizarre 1 – (2xCD) 2000, Disc #2, Track #1 "Legion" – Angelstar
Critical M@55 – (CD) 2000, Track #8 "Rubicon" – Metropolis
Metropolis 2000 – (CD) 2000, Track #3 "Darkangel" – Metropolis
Orkus Club Hits 1 – (CD) 2000, Track #7 "Dark Angel (Album Version)" – Orkus
Prospective Music Magazine: Volume 4 – (CD) 2000, Track #1 "Dark Angel (Gabriel)" – Prospective Music Magazine
We Came to Dance 2000 – (2xCD) 2000, Disc #1, Track #3 "Darkangel (Apocalyptic Mix)" – GTN (Global Trance Network)
Zillo Club Hits 5 – (CD) 2000, Track #1 "Legion (Janus Version)" – Zillo
:Per:Version: Vol. 1 – (CD Enhanced) 2001, Track #3 "Standing (Motion)" – :Ritual:
D-Side 3 – (CD Sampler) Track #5 "Cold (Rated 'R' Mix By Mig 29)" – D-Side
Future Pop 01 – The Best of Modern Electronic – (2xCD) 2001, Disc #1, Track #4 "Standing (Motion)" – Angelstar
Septic II – (CD) 2001, Track #1 "Further (RMX)" – Dependent Records
Sonic Seducer Cold Hands Seduction Vol. XIV – (CD Enhanced + VCD) Disc #1, Track #1 "Epicentre" – Sonic Seducer
Zillo Festival Sampler 2001 – (CD Sampler) 2001, Track #15 "Frika" – Zillo
ZilloScope: New Signs & Sounds 12/01-01/02 – (CD Sampler, Enhanced) 2001, Track #8 "Holding On" – Zillo
Advanced Electronics – (2xCD) 2002, Disc #1, Track #1 "Genesis (C92-Remix)" – Synthetic Symphony
Critical M@55 Volume 3 – (CD Sampler) 2002, Track #4 "Genesis" – Metropolis
D-Side 8 – (CD Sampler) 2002, Track #4 "Epicentre" – D-Side
Deejay Parade Vol. 7 – (2xCD) 2002, Disc #2, Track #5 "Beloved (Hiver & Hammer UK Dubtrip)" – Dance Network
Die Flut – (2xCD) 2002, Disc #2, Track #15 "Left Behind" – Scanner
DJ Convention – Code Thirteen – (2xCD Mixed) 2002, Disc #2, Track #12 "Beloved (Hiver & Hammer's UK Dubtrip)" – Polystar Records
Goodbye Ibiza (The Closing Party Compilation) – (2xCD) 2002, Disc #2, Track #9 "Beloved (Hiver & Hammer UK Dubtrip)" – More Music
Judgement Day Festival Compilation Vol. 1 – (CD) 2002, Track #2 "Standing (Original)" – Batbeliever Releases
Metropolis 2002 – (CD) 2002, Track #9 "Epicenter" – Metropolis
Orkus Presents: The Best of 2001 – (CD) 2002, Disc #1, Track #3 "Genesis (Single Version)" – Orkus, Angelwings
Orkus Presents: The Best of 2002 – (CD) 2002, Disc #1, Track #3 "Beloved (Grey Dawn Rmx)" – Orkus, Angelwings
Orkus Presents: The Best of the 90s 2 – (2xCD) 2002, Disc #1, Track #8 "Solitary (Signals Version)" – Orkus
Oslo Synthfestival 2002 – (CD) 2002, Track #2 "Epicentre" – Oslo Synthfestival
Sonic Seducer Cold Hands Seduction Vol. 20 – (CD Sampler + VCD) 2002, VCD #2 "Epicentre (Live)" – Sonic Seducer
Synth & Wave Essentials – (2xCD) 2002, Disc #2, Track #14 "Epicentre" – ZYX Music
Techno Club Vol. 17 – Talla 2XLC >>> His Own Challenge  – (2xCD) 2002, Disc #2, Track #7 "Beloved (Hiver & Hammer UK Dubtrip)" – Dance Division
Trancemaster 3004 – (2xCD) 2002, Disc #2, Track #5 "Beloved (Hiver & Hammer Full Vocal Mix)" – Vision Soundcarriers
Zillo Dark Summer – Best of Goth Open Airs 2002 – (2xCD) 2002, Disc #1, Track # 4 "Genesis (C92 Version)" – Zillo
Advanced Electronics Vol. 2  – (2xCD) 2003, Disc #1, Track #1 "Honour 2003 (FDR Version)" – Synthetic Symphony • (2xCD, Reissue) 2007, Disc #1, Track #1 "Honour 2003 (FDR Version)" – Synthetic Symphony
D-Side 17 – (CD Sampler) 2003, Track #4 "Legion (Live)" – D-Side
Dark Nights (The Best of Technopop & Futurepop) – (2xCD) 2003, Disc #2, Track #2 "Beloved" – Bit Music
Dark Roses – 36 Mystic and Electropop Romantics – (2xCD) 2003, Disc #1, Track #7 "Genesis (Single Version)" – Sony Music Entertainment (Germany)
Electrixmas 2003 – (CD Enhanced, Promo) 2003, Track #12 "Epicenter" – Electrixmas
Extreme Clubhits VII – (CD) 2003, Track #2 "Genesis (C-92 Mix)" – UpSolution Recordings
Nachtwelten – (CD) 2003, Track #15 "Beloved" – Terra Zone
Sonic Seducer Cold Hands Seduction Vol. 29 – (CD Sampler, Enhanced) 2003, Video #1 "Pastperfect Trailer 3.0" – Sonic Seducer
This Is Neo-Goth – (3xCD) 2003, Disc #1, Track #1 "Genesis (Icon Of Coil Version)" – Cleopatra
Tonedeaf Records Presents: Vinyl Conflict No. 1 – (CD) 2003,  Track #11 "Fearless" – ToneDeaf Records
2Faces – (CD, Mixed) 2004, Track #8 "Beloved (Hiver & Hammer's UK Dub Trip)" – Silly Spider Music
Dependence – Next Level Electronics – (CD) 2004, Track #6 "Legion (Anachron)" – Dependent Records
Dimitris Papaspyropoulos Presents: Blessed and Cursed – (2xCD) 2004, Disc #2, Track #5 "Genesis (Apoptygma Berzerk Remix)" – Eros Music (Greece)
Into The Darkness Volume 1 – (DVD) 2004, Track #3 "Legion" – Nightclub Records
New Signs & Sounds 6/04 – (CD Sampler, Enhanced) 2004, Video #1 "Honour (Live)" – Zillo
Psycho Tina's Hell House of Horrors – (CD Enhanced) 2004, Track #11 "Circling Overland" – Cleopatra
Advanced Electronics Vol. 4 – (2xCD) 2005, Disc #1, Track #3 "Chrome (Soman Rx Longer)" – Synthetic Symphony
Cyberl@b Volume [5.0] – (2xCD) 2005, Disc #1, Track #7 "Chrome" – Alfa Matrix
D-Side 27 – (CD Sampler) 2005, Track #5 "Entropy" – D-Side
Dark Summer 2005 • 2 – (CD Sampler) 2005, Track #1 "Chrome" – Zillo
E:O:D Vol. 1 (2xCD) – (2xCD) 2005, Disc #1, Track #11 "Structure" – Excentric Records
Extreme Clubhits X – (2xCD, Ltd. Edition) Disc #1, Track #1 "Chrome" – UpSolution Recordings
Into the Darkness Volume 2 – (DVD) 2005, Track #8 "Honour 2003 (Wave Gotik Treffen)" – Nightclub Records
M'era Luna Festival 2005 – (2xCD) 2005, Disc #1, Track #1 "Perpetual" – Totentanz
Metropolis 2005 – (CD + DVD) 2005, CD Track #2 "Chrome" and DVD Track #5 "Beloved" – Metropolis
New Signs & Sounds 02/05 – (CD Sampler, Enhanced) 2005, Video Interview "Elektronisches Hilfswerk" – Zillo
New Signs & Sounds 04/05 – (CD Sampler, Enhanced) 2005, Track #1 "Entropy" – Zillo
Orkus Presents: The Ultimate Club Guide 2 (KulturRuine: Die Ersten 10 Jahre) – (2xCD) 2005, "Electronaut" – Angelstar, Orkus
Sonic Seducer Cold Hands Seduction Vol. 48 – (CD Sampler, Enhanced) – (CD Sampler, Enhanced) 2005, Track #4 "Chrome (Bolloxed Remix)" – Sonic Seducer
Sonic Seducer Cold Hands Seduction Vol. 54 – (CD Sampler, Enhanced + VCD) 2005, VCD Video #1 "Chrome (Live)" – Sonic Seducer
This Is... Techno Body Music Vol. 1 – (2xCD) 2005, Disc #1, Track #8 "Interceptor (ABM Version)" – Masterhit Recordings
Castle Party 2006 – (CD) 2006, Track #2 "Chrome" – Castle Party Productions
Dark Flower Vol. II – (2xCD) 2006, Disc #1, Track #3 "Perpetual" – Angelstar
Extended Electronics – (2xCD) 2006, Disc #1, Track #5 "Chrome (22.7 Mhz Mix by Modcom)" – Angelstar
Infacted 3 – (CD)  2006, Track #1 "Chrome (27.2 Mhz Mix by Modcom)" – Infacted Recordings
Orkus Presents: The Best of 2005 – (2xCD) 2006, Disc #1, Track #14 "Chrome" – Angelstar
[:SITD:] Bestie:Mensch – (CD Album + CD, Ltd. Edition) 2007, Disc #2, Track #1 "Chrome" – Accession Records
D-Side 39 – (CD Sampler) 2007, Track #5 "Nemesis (Divine Command Version)" – D-Side
Extreme Clubhits XI – (2xCD) 2007, Disc #1, Track #7 "Nemesis (Full Length)" – Indigo, Upscene
Fxxk The Mainstream Vol. 1 – (4xCD) 2007, Disc #4, Track #5 "Nemesis (Divine Command Mix)" – Alfa Matrix
M'era Luna – Best of 2000 – 2006 – (DVD Sampler) 2007, Track #7 "Chrome (M'era Luna 2005)" – Sonic Seducer
New Signs & Sounds 04/07 – (CD Sampler, Enhanced) 2007, Track #10 "Nemesis (Divine Command Edit)" – Zillo
DJ Gio MC-505 @ Electro Remote Controller Vol. 02 – (CDr, Promo) 2008, Track #26 "Standing" – Robot Radio Mix
Metropolis:Rebirth 1.0 – (2xCD) 2008, Disc #1, Track #1 "Nemesis" – Metropolis
Sonic Seducer Cold Hands Seduction Vol. 82 – (DVD) 2008, Track #2 "Perpetual (Live 2007) (Unveröffentlicht)" – Sonic Seducer

Remixes
As of 2011, VNV Nation has remixed the songs of 24 artists.
!Aiboforcen - "E.W.I.F"
Wumpscut - "Totmacher"
AFI - "Miss Murder"
Apoptygma Berzerk - "Kathy's Song (Come Lie Next to Me)"
Bio-Tek - "Die-Sect"
Boytronic - "Living Without You"
Claire Voyant - "Majesty"
Combichrist - "All Pain is Gone"
D.A.F. - "Der Sheriff"
Das Ich - "Destillat"
Deine Lakaien - "Where You Are"
De/Vision - "I Regret"
In Strict Confidence - "Industrial Love"
Ironbase - "Maschine Eisenbass Rockt"
Joachim Witt - "Wo Versteckt Sich Gott?"
Lights of Euphoria - "True Life"
Mindless Self Indulgence - "Shut Me Up", "What Do They Know"
Phillip Boa - "So What"
Project Pitchfork - "Existence"
Ravelab - "Push"
Revolution By Night - "Faithless"
Suicide Commando - "Hellraiser"
Theatre of Tragedy - "Machine"
Within Temptation - "Sinéad"

References

Discographies of British artists
Electronic music discographies
VNV Nation albums